Seyyed Ahmad Reza Shahrokhi (born 1966, Khorramabad, Lorestan), is the representative of the Supreme Leader of Iran (Seyyed Ali Khamenei) in the province of Lorestan since 2019; and is also the Imam of Friday Prayer in the city of Khorramabad.

Life 
Seyyed Ahmad Reza who is known as "Ayatollah-Shahrokhi" and/or "Hojat-al-Islam Shahrokhi", is the son of "Seyyed Mohammad Naghi Shahrokhi" who was previously the representative of the Supreme leader in the west of Asia (i.e. in the countries of Thailand, Myanmar, Bangladesh, Sri Lanka, India). Seyyed Ahmad-Reza passed his seminary (Hawzah) education(s) by the known Shia scholars/teachers among Nasser Makarem Shirazi and Jafar Sobhani. He possesses a doctorate in the field of philosophy/theology; and he is a teacher at university courses, too. This Iranian Twelver cleric has also written several volumes of books/articles.

See also 
 List of provincial representatives appointed by Supreme Leader of Iran

References

Representatives of the Supreme Leader in the Provinces of Iran
Iranian ayatollahs
1966 births
Living people
People from Khorramabad